Sierra Entertainment is a software label which publishes games from indie developers. Founded in 1979 by Ken and Roberta Williams, it developed and published a large variety of video games, including a number of best-selling games and series, for various platforms between 1980 and 2008. After 2004, Sierra developed no new games but worked strictly as a publishing label for their parent company Vivendi Games. In 2014, the brand was resurrected as an indie publisher by owners Activision Blizzard.

Games

Post-Activision merger titles

Retained by Activision

As a indie label of Activision

Unreleased games 
 Leisure Suit Larry 4 (unwritten; number skipped as a gag)
 Leisure Suit Larry 8: Lust in Space
 Space Quest VII: Return to Roman Numerals
 King's Quest IX (untitled)
 Untitled King Videogame

Non-game software 
 Homeword
 Laffer Utilities

Notes

References 

Sierra Entertainment

Adventure games